Muragacha Government College  established in 2015, is the government general degree college in Muragacha, Nadia district. It offers undergraduate courses in science and arts. It is affiliated to University of Kalyani.

Departments

Science
Physics
Chemistry
Mathematics

Arts 
Bengali
English
History
Political Science
Education

See also

References

External links
Muragacha Government College
Online admission website
University of Kalyani
University Grants Commission
National Assessment and Accreditation Council

Universities and colleges in Nadia district
Colleges affiliated to University of Kalyani
Educational institutions established in 2015
2015 establishments in West Bengal
Government colleges in West Bengal